The Selton Hill Ambush took place on 11 March 1921, during the Irish War of Independence. An Irish Republican Army (IRA)  flying column was ambushed by members of the RIC Auxiliary Division at Selton Hill (a.k.a. Seltan Hill), County Leitrim. Six IRA members of the South Leitrim Brigade were killed, which effectively destroyed the IRA in South Leitrim.

Background
Seán Connolly was an IRA activist from County Longford, but he was also used by IRA GHQ to organise surrounding areas; first County Roscommon and then County Leitrim. When Michael Collins ordered Connolly into the county, he warned that it was "the most treacherous county in Ireland".  As Connolly was running a training camp at Selton Hill in early 1921, his position was given to the RIC. The RIC District Inspector, Thomas Gore-Hickman, had been alerted to Connolly's position by a local doctor who had served in the British Army. The doctor had reportedly been told of the training camp by a local member of the Orange Order.

Ambush
The events at Selton Hill took place one week after the Sheemore ambush, in which British troops from the Bedfordshire & Hertfordshire Regiment, based in Boyle suffered several casualties and at least one fatality. At Selton Hill, a large force of RIC and Auxiliaires, based in Mohill and troops from the Bedfordshire & Hertfordshire Regiment surrounded and then attacked the IRA camp on 11 March. Six IRA volunteers were killed. The RIC suffered no losses. The IRA dead were Sean Connolly, Seamus Wrynne, Joseph O'Beirne (or Beirne), John Reilly, Joseph Reilly, and Capt ME Baxter.

Ernie O'Malley later claimed the volunteers' bodies were "taken to Mohill by soldiers who shouted 'fresh meat!' as they were driving through the town". O'Malley was quoted as saying "Men from the Bedfordshire Regiment were seen by a badly wounded IRA officer, Bernie Sweeney who survived, to use rifle butts on the skulls of two wounded men." He also stated that the location of the column was given to the local D/I of the RIC by a doctor who had been in the British Army, who received the information by a local Orangeman. The IRA officer who survived was Bernie Sweeney, from Ballinamore, who  survived by hiding in a drain, where the cold water prevented him bleeding to death. He was rescued and hidden from the Black and Tans and Auxiliaries by locals.

Aftermath
The IRA learned their position had been given away by the doctor and the Orangeman; the latter was later killed by the IRA (30 March 1921). The doctor escaped to England and later died in an accident.

The border country of the north midlands often proved to be a treacherous place for IRA training camps. On 8 May 1921 another camp (of Belfast IRA volunteers) based in the Lappanduff hills in neighbouring County Cavan, was also surprised – one volunteer was killed, thirteen captured, and much arms and ammunition seized by the British forces.

See also
Timeline of the Irish War of Independence

References

Conflicts in 1921
Military actions and engagements during the Irish War of Independence
History of County Leitrim
1921 in Ireland
Royal Irish Constabulary
March 1921 events
Ambushes